Edward Colman (c.1734–1815) was an English army officer, politician and official.

He was the son of William Colman of Gornhay, Tiverton, Devon. He joined the Army and rose to the rank of Major before retiring in 1775.

Colman was MP for Orford from 1768 to 1771. He was appointed Clerk of the robes and wardrobes (1770–75), Gentleman usher of the privy chamber (1771–75) and Serjeant-at-Arms of the British House of Commons (1775–1805). He was married, and had two sons and two daughters.

References

1734 births
1815 deaths
Politicians from Tiverton, Devon
1st The Royal Dragoons officers
Members of the Parliament of Great Britain for English constituencies
British MPs 1768–1774
Serjeants-at-Arms of the British House of Commons
Military personnel from Tiverton, Devon